This is a list of events from British radio in 1952.

Events

January
22 January – First broadcast of The Goon Show under this title. Around the start of the third series at the end of the year, Spike Milligan, the principal writer, suffers a nervous breakdown.

February
6 February – Following the death of King George VI, discovered at 7.30am, the BBC broadcasts the news at 11.15am; the news is repeated seven times, every 15 minutes, and then the BBC goes silent for five hours.

March to July
No events.

August
26 August – Hit radio series Welsh Rarebit, broadcast from the BBC Cardiff studios, transfers to television.

September
No events.

Ocvtober
15 October – First broadcast of a series of Sherlock Holmes, with Carleton Hobbs in the title role, which will continue intermittently until 1969.

November
No events.

December
No events.

Continuing radio programmes

1930s
 In Town Tonight (1933–1960)

1940s
 Music While You Work (1940–1967)
 Sunday Half Hour (1940–2018)
 Desert Island Discs (1942–Present)
 Family Favourites (1945–1980)
 Down Your Way (1946–1992)
 Have A Go (1946–1967)
 Housewives' Choice (1946–1967)
 Letter from America (1946–2004)
 Woman's Hour (1946–Present)
 Twenty Questions (1947–1976)
 Any Questions? (1948–Present)
 Mrs Dale's Diary (1948–1969)
 Take It from Here (1948–1960)
 Billy Cotton Band Show (1949–1968)
 A Book at Bedtime (1949–Present)
 Ray's a Laugh (1949–1961)

1950s
 The Archers (1950–Present)
 Educating Archie (1950–1960)
 Listen with Mother (1950–1982)

Births
4 February – Harriet Cass, radio newsreader and announcer
11 March – Douglas Adams, writer (The Hitchhiker's Guide to the Galaxy) (d. 2001))
12 March – Chris Needs, Welsh radio host (d. 2020)
23 May – Dillie Keane, cabaret writer-performer and broadcaster
11 September – Catherine Bott, soprano and music presenter
10 December – Clive Anderson, broadcast presenter, comedy writer and barrister
26 December – Jon Glover, actor

Deaths 

 19 April – Steve Conway, singer (b. 1920)

See also 
 1952 in British music
 1952 in British television
 1952 in the United Kingdom
 List of British films of 1952

References 

 
Years in British radio
Radio